Beverley Ussher ( – September 1757) was an Irish Member of Parliament.

Biography
He was the son of Beverley Ussher of Kilmeadan in County Waterford. He was High Sheriff of County Waterford in 1733 and then represented the county in the Irish House of Commons from 1735 until his death. He also served as Mayor of Waterford in 1744. Two of his daughters married MPs: Mary married John Congreve in 1758 and Elizabeth married Henry Alcock in 1766.

References

1700s births
1757 deaths
High Sheriffs of County Waterford
Irish MPs 1727–1760
Members of the Parliament of Ireland (pre-1801) for County Waterford constituencies